Raissa Herradura Jajurie is a Moro Filipino lawyer and human rights activist who is a member of the Bangsamoro Parliament. She also heads the Ministry of Social Services and Development of Bangsamoro.

Education
Born in Sulu, Raissa Herradura Jajurie attended the Ateneo de Manila University where she graduated with a degree in political science. She finished her studies in law at the University of the Philippines.

Career
Jajurie would be part of the Sentro ng Alternatibong Lingap Panligal (SALIGAN), alternative law group fulfilling various roles within the organization and would found the Nisa Ul-Haqq fi Bangsamoro (Women for Justice in the Bangsamoro).

Jajurie was also a legal consultant for the Moro Islamic Liberation Front (MILF). She worked with the rebel group during its peace process negotiations with the national government of the Philippines during the administration of President Benigno Aquino III. She was also part of the Bangsamoro Transition Commission from 2013 to 2019 which was in task of creating a draft for the law which would become the Bangsamoro Organic Law.

Upon the creation of the Bangsamoro autonomous region in 2019, Jajurie was named part of the first Bangsamoro Transition Authority which served as the interim Bangsamoro Parliament.

References

Members of the Bangsamoro Transition Authority Parliament
Living people
Filipino Muslims
University of the Philippines alumni
Ateneo de Manila University alumni
Filipino women lawyers
People from Sulu
21st-century Filipino women politicians
Year of birth missing (living people)